The 1994 European Rallycross Championship season was the nineteenth season of the FIA European Rallycross Championship under that name. It was held across eleven rounds starting at the Rallycross-Ring in Austria on April 17 and ending at the Estering in Germany on October 2.

The champions were Richard Hutton (Division 1), Kenneth Hansen (Division 2), and Susann Bergvall (1400 Cup), who became the first ever female European Rallycross champion.

Calendar

Drivers

Div. 1

Div. 2

1400 Cup

Standings

Div. 1

References
Season overview

1994 in motorsport
1994 in European sport
European Rallycross Championship seasons